Lullaby for the Hearts of Space (1980) is an album by the American ambient musician Kevin Braheny.

Both pieces on the album were performed live using the Mighty Serge modular analog synthesizer and were spontaneous, improvised compositions. The first track, "Lullaby for the Hearts of Space", was originally recorded for a Hearts of Space radio special at KPFA-FM in March, 1980. The second track, "After I Said Goodnight," took inspiration from Emilie Conrad-Da'Oud's work Continuum and was created live during one of her classes.

Unlike Braheny's other albums, Lullaby for the Hearts of Space was not released on compact disc until 2017, reportedly because Braheny was not fond of the results.  Braheny asked Hearts of Space to not release additional copies after the existing copies had sold out and the request was granted. As a result, the album has been difficult to find. The recording was remastered by Braheny Fortune, and it was released on CD and digital formats on June 16, 2017.

Track listings
 "Lullaby for the Hearts of Space" – 35:38
 "After I Said Goodnight" – 33:02

The cassette's liner and label misprints the track times for the tracks of this album, with "Lullaby for the Hearts of Space" being 25:10 in length and "After I Said Goodnight" at 26:00. Coincidentally, the tracks on Braheny's prior album The Way Home are 25:10 and 26:00, respectively.

Personnel
Kevin Braheny – The Mighty Serge Modular

References

External links
Lullaby for the Hearts of Space at Discogs

1980 albums
New-age albums by American artists
Ambient albums by American artists